KLFB-LD, virtual and UHF digital channel 22, is a low-power 3ABN-affiliated television station licensed to Salinas, California, United States. Founded on November 30, 1989, the station is owned by Living Faith Broadcasting and is associated with local Seventh-day Adventist churches.

References

External links 
3ABN official website

Religious television stations in the United States
Three Angels Broadcasting Network
LFB-LD
Television channels and stations established in 1989
Low-power television stations in the United States
1989 establishments in California